The Rose is a 1979 American musical drama film directed by Mark Rydell, and starring Bette Midler, Alan Bates, Frederic Forrest, Harry Dean Stanton, Barry Primus, and David Keith. Loosely based on the life of Janis Joplin, the film follows a self-destructive rock star in the late 1960s, who struggles to cope with the pressures of her career and the demands of her ruthless business manager.

Originally titled Pearl (after Janis Joplin's nickname, which was also the title of her last album), the film's screenplay was revised and fictionalized after her family declined to allow the producers the rights to her story.

The Rose was nominated for four Academy Awards including Best Actress in a Leading Role (Bette Midler, in her screen debut), Best Actor in a Supporting Role (Frederic Forrest), Best Film Editing and Best Sound. Midler performed the soundtrack album for the film, and its title track became one of her biggest hit singles.

Plot
In late 1969, Mary Rose Foster is a famous rock and roll diva known as "The Rose." In spite of her success, her personal life is lonely and exhausting. She is exploited and overworked by her gruff, greedy manager and promoter Rudge Campbell. Though forthright and brassy, Rose is an insecure alcoholic and former drug user who seems to crave approval in her life. As such, she is determined to return to her Florida hometown, now as a superstar, and perform for the people from her past.

Following a performance in Texas, Rose meets with country music star Billy Ray, whom she idolizes and whose songs she often covers in live shows. Billy Ray cruelly demands that she never perform his music again, and he rudely dismisses her. After discovering that Rudge arranged the meeting because he wants to sign Billy Ray to his label, Rose defiantly flees with a limousine driver named Huston Dyer. The two take a cross-country trip to New York City, where Rose is scheduled to complete recording sessions. They begin a whirlwind romance.

Rudge assumes that Huston is just another hanger-on, but Rose feels she has finally met her true love. Huston eventually admits to her that he is actually an AWOL sergeant from the Army, and she tells him of her past in Florida. The couple's relationship grows turbulent amidst Rose's reckless lifestyle and constant touring. In Memphis, Rose is met by Sarah, a former lover of hers. When Huston walks in on the two women kissing, he and Rose get into a violent fight, after which Huston flees.

Determined to reunite with Huston, Rose searches for him in a red light district of Memphis with PFC Mal, a military member whom she met in Texas. She subsequently appoints Mal as her security escort, and the two travel to Rose's hometown Jacksonville, Florida, where Rudge has booked her a hometown reunion show. Upon arriving, Rose shows Mal her childhood home, her high school, and other local landmarks from her childhood. Arriving at the stadium for afternoon rehearsals for her concert, Rose repeats her intention to take a one-year break from performing, leading Rudge to tell her she will be in breach of contract. Rudge proceeds to fire her, though unbeknownst to Rose, this is only a ploy to ensure that she performs the show. A distraught Rose is met by Huston, who has traveled to Jacksonville to reunite with her.

Believing her concert is cancelled, Rose decides to run away and start a new life with Huston. That night, she takes Huston on a tour of local bars and clubs she used to frequent prior to becoming famous, recklessly drinking and indulging in barbiturates and heroin. At one bar, Huston becomes jealous when a male patron harasses Rose as she performs, and he begins a fight. After, Rudge reaches Rose on her car phone and convinces her to return for the concert. She acquiesces, and her decision to appease Rudge causes Huston to give up on the relationship and leave town. Later that night, after performing the opening song of her long-awaited homecoming concert, Rose collapses onstage and dies of an overdose.

Cast

Production

Conception
The film was originally offered to Ken Russell, who chose instead to direct Valentino. Russell has described this decision as the biggest mistake of his career. At one point, Michael Cimino was also slated to direct, but he chose to direct Heaven's Gate instead. Cimino did, however, make uncredited contributions to the script.

Casting
Suzy Williams was originally offered the title role, but turned it down for personal reasons, instead suggesting it to Bette Midler.

Filming
The Rose was completed in time for a scheduled release in April 1979; however, 20th Century-Fox elected to postpone release til autumn 1979:(Mark Rydell quote:)"[at] Easter time...the public seems to like frothy films."

Reception
The Rose received a mixed to positive critical reception. The film has a 73% rating on Rotten Tomatoes, based on 22 reviews. Among the positive reviews were Siskel & Ebert, who on their program "Sneak Previews", both gave the film a collective "Yes".

The film opened in New York City on Wednesday, November 7, 1979 and grossed $793,063 in its opening weekend from 44 screens, the second highest-grossing opening weekend on under 50 screens behind Star Wars (1977). The film went on to gross $29.2 million in the United States and Canada.

Awards and nominations

Others
The film is recognized by American Film Institute in these lists:
 2004: AFI's 100 Years...100 Songs:
 "The Rose" – #83

Home video
The Criterion Collection released the film on Blu-ray and DVD on May 19, 2015.

See also
 The Rose (song)

References

Sources

External links
 
 
 
 
 The Rose: High Tragedy on Tour an essay by Paula Mejia at the Criterion Collection

1979 films
1970s English-language films
1970s musical drama films
1979 LGBT-related films
American LGBT-related films
American musical drama films
American rock music films
Cultural depictions of Janis Joplin
Films about drugs
Films directed by Mark Rydell
Films featuring a Best Musical or Comedy Actress Golden Globe winning performance
Films set in 1969
Films shot in California
Films shot in Los Angeles
Films shot in New York City
Films with screenplays by Bo Goldman
LGBT-related musical drama films
20th Century Fox films
1979 drama films
Films set in Memphis, Tennessee
Films set in Florida
1970s American films